Woolbeding House is an 18th-century country house in Woolbeding, near Midhurst, West Sussex, England. It is a Grade I listed building. 

It was probably built by Sir Richard Mill Bt between 1711 and 1760 and was originally of a quadrangular plan with an open courtyard in the middle. The courtyard was later roofed over. The house is built of coursed Hythe sandstone in 2 storeys with an attic and has a 7-bay south-facing frontage with 5 hipped dormers.

History
The manor of Woolbeding belonged to William Aylyng in 1567 and passed by marriage to the Grey family. The Greys owned the manor until Margaret Grey married Sir John Mill in 1652. It then passed down in the Mill family until 1791, the manor house having been remodelled by Sir Richard Mill in the meantime. 

In 1791 the Rev. Sir Charles Mill, 8th Baronet sold the house and estate to Lord Robert Spencer, the youngest son of the 3rd Duke of Marlborough, who immediately made a number of alterations to the house, including the roofing over of the central courtyard. The house then descended in the Spencer family via his stepdaughter Diana Bouverie to her daughter, who bequeathed it to the Lascelles family. They in turn made it over in the late 1940s to the National Trust, who leased it to businessman, philanthropist and art collector Simon Sainsbury until his death in 2006. His partner Stewart Grimshaw remained in occupation afterwards.

A feature in the gardens is the Cedra fountain by the artist Walter Pye, which stands on the spot once occupied by a venerable cedar tree. The gardens have been open to the public since 2010.

References

Grade I listed buildings in West Sussex
Country houses in West Sussex